The Merizo Bell Tower, on Guam Highway 4 in Merizo, Guam, is a bell tower that was built in 1914 or 1919.  It was listed on the U.S. National Register of Historic Places in 1975.

The tower is significant for association with a Catholic priest, Father Cristobal de Canals, who built the bell tower and a church and took many steps to promote agriculture and raise the standard of living in the village of Merizo. Architecturally, the tower symbolizes transition between colonial Spanish architecture and more modern methods;  a major element of its design is its massing.

See also
National Register of Historic Places listings in Guam

References 

Buildings and structures on the National Register of Historic Places in Guam
Buildings and structures completed in 1919
Buildings and structures in Guam
Christian bell towers
1910s establishments in Guam